Kolélas is a surname. Notable people with the name include:

Bernard Kolélas (1933–2009), Congolese politician
Euloge Landry Kolélas, Congolese politician
Guy Brice Parfait Kolélas (1959–2021), Congolese politician

Surnames of African origin